The American Mime Theatre is a professional performing company and training school based in New York City. It was founded in 1952 by Paul J. Curtis (August 29, 1927– April 28, 2012). It is the oldest continuing professional mime company in the United States. The theatre ran under the direction of founder Paul J. Curtis for 60 years. Some of his notable students include Anita Morris, and Sally Kirkland.

Reviews
In 1984, the New York Times wrote: "As one of the few who toiled in the vineyards over the decades when mime was considered chiefly a European import, Mr. Curtis deserves credit where credit is due.  The program that the American Mime Theater is offering... demonstrated an independent view of mime that owes little to conventions associated with the form...... it allows for a free-form approach that roams between the realistic and the stylized."

References

External links
 Official website

Mime
Drama schools in the United States
Performing groups established in 1952
Educational institutions established in 1952
1952 establishments in New York City